Joseph Miller (born January 22, 1985) is an American former professional stock car racing driver in the American Speed Association, the ARCA Re/Max Series and the NASCAR Craftsman Truck Series.

Career
Miller grew up in the Lakeville, Minnesota, area. He began racing quarter midgets at the age of 12 and eventually ran various hobby stock series races, winning many races. He had 22 starts in the American Speed Association with three top tens. He also competed in the ARCA RE/MAX Series, winning his first start in 2004 and scoring four more wins in his rookie year (2005) with Country Joe Racing. He easily clinched 2005 Rookie of the Year but finished second to Frank Kimmel for the championship.

In 2006, Miller attempted the full schedule in the Craftsman Truck Series, driving the No. 12 Toyota Tundra for Darrell Waltrip Motorsports. After fourteen starts and a fifth-place finish at Mansfield Motorsports Speedway, he was released from his ride due to a lack of sponsorship.

Miller competed infrequently in the ARCA series with his old family-owned team, but the team eventually sold all of its equipment. Miller returned to the ARCA series for one last race at the Pocono Raceway on August 5, 2007, but he crashed in an accident not of his doing. In the post-incident interview, he said that he was returning to help run the family housing business in Minnesota and that he would probably not race again. However, in late August 2011, Miller returned to the ARCA Racing Series at the Madison International Speedway with Win-Tron Racing's No. 32 Champion Oil Dodge. Miller now owns a home building business named Country Joe Homes and resides in the Twin Cities area. He runs Super Late models at Elko Speedway on Saturday nights during the summer.

Motorsports career results

NASCAR
(key) (Bold – Pole position awarded by qualifying time. Italics – Pole position earned by points standings or practice time. * – Most laps led.)

Busch Series

 Season still in progress
 Ineligible for series points

Craftsman Truck Series

ARCA Racing Series

External links
 

1985 births
American Speed Association drivers
ARCA Menards Series drivers
ARCA Midwest Tour drivers
Living people
NASCAR drivers
People from Lakeville, Minnesota
Racing drivers from Minnesota
Michael Waltrip Racing drivers